
The Animal Welfare Act 1999 is a current Act of Parliament in New Zealand. It is administered by the Ministry for Primary Industries.

See also
Animal welfare in New Zealand
Agriculture in New Zealand

References

Further reading

External links
Text of the Act at the Parliamentary Counsel Office
 

Statutes of New Zealand
1999 in New Zealand law
Animal welfare and rights legislation
Animal welfare in New Zealand